Campina is a Dutch dairy cooperative. Main brands include Campina, Landliebe and Mona. In 2008, it merged with Royal Frieslands Foods. The name of the new company is FrieslandCampina.

The company history starts with many village cooperatives that gradually merged into each other and thus became big regional companies. Campina in its current form was created in 1989 by the merge of two of such regional cooperatives, Melkunie Holland and DMV Campina. After this merger the company was named Campina Melkunie until it dropped the Melkunie part in 2001.

In 2004, Campina and Arla, a Danish dairy cooperative, announced their plan to merge,  however this plan was disbanded in April 2005 for undisclosed reasons  although plans for other forms of cooperation would still be considered.

On 19 December 2007, Campina and Friesland Foods announced that the companies are exploring the possibility to merge. The EU approved the merger if the two cooperatives sell certain cheese and dairy drink divisions.

Brands with Health Benefit Claims
 Campina Optimel (Netherlands)
 Campina Optiwell (Germany)
 Campina Vifit (Germany, Netherlands)
 Campina Fruttis (Russia)
 Campina Betagen (Thailand) – joint venture with Thai Advanced Food

Acquisitions
 Comelco NV in (Belgium) 1989
 Deltown Specialities in (United States) 1989
 Menken consumptiemelk activiteiten (Netherlands) 1997
 Menken Dairy Food (Netherlands) 1997
 Menken Polderland (Netherlands) 1997
 Parmalat Thailand (Thailand) 2003
 Inovatech Argentina (Argentina) 2005

In Germany, now Campina GmbH
 Südmilch AG, 1993
 Kutel, 1998
 Emzett, 1999
 Strothmann

References

External links
 

FrieslandCampina subsidiaries
Cooperatives in the Netherlands
Dairy products companies of the Netherlands
Zaltbommel
Food and drink companies established in 1979
Companies based in Gelderland